The Promise is the third single released by the Duran Duran offshoot band Arcadia. It was released by Parlophone Records in 1986 as the group's second UK single. It peaked at number 37 on the UK Singles Chart.

The track features an uncredited backing vocal by Sting. Sometime during the band's stay in Paris to record So Red The Rose, they went to see a Sting concert there, and decided it would be interesting to have him come over and sing on the album, mainly because they liked the combination of Sting's and lead singer Simon Le Bon's voices on the "Do They Know It's Christmas?" single by Band Aid, and wanted to see what would result from putting them together again. Sting was very amicable about the whole idea, and it turned out to be one of the band's favourite moments on the record.

B-sides, bonus tracks and remixes
The single mix for "The Promise" was heavily edited down from the album's hefty 7:28 to a leaner, more radio-friendly 4:45. In fact, even Alex Sadkin and Ron Saint Germain's "Extended remix" clocked in at only 7:05, almost 25 seconds shy of the album cut.

The B-side to the single was an extended mix of album track "Rose Arcana".

Covers, samples, & media references
Novembre covered "The Promise" as a bonus track on their 2006 album Materia.

Formats and track listing

7": Parlophone. / NSR 2 (UK)
 "The Promise" (7" Mix) - 4:45
 "Rose Arcana" (Extended) - 5:37
 The Album Version of Rose Arcana has a running time of only 0:51 seconds.

12": Parlophone. / 12 NSR 2 (UK)
 "The Promise" (Extended Remix) - 7:06
 "Rose Arcana" (Extended) - 5:37
 "The Promise" (7" Mix) - 4:45
 The Album Version of Rose Arcana has a running time of only 0:51 seconds.

Personnel
Arcadia are:
Simon Le Bon - vocals 
Nick Rhodes - keyboards
Roger Taylor - drums

Also credited:
Alex Sadkin - producer and engineer
Sting - backing vocals
David Gilmour - guitars
Mark Egan - fretless bass

References

1986 singles
Arcadia (band) songs
Songs written by John Taylor (bass guitarist)
1985 songs
Parlophone singles
Songs written by Nick Rhodes
Songs written by Simon Le Bon
Song recordings produced by Alex Sadkin